Dr. Woldai Futur (alt. Wolday) is the first Minister of National Development of Eritrea. His previous post was serving as an economic advisor to the President.

Early life and education
Woldai Futur received his PhD at Southern Illinois University at Carbondale in Economics. Woldai also was a former employee of the United Nations.

Minister of National Development of Eritrea
In a 2003 interview with IRIN News, Futur said that he did not believe that Eritrea's lack of foreign investment was due to their macro-economic, investment, trade, or economic policies. He speculated that this disadvantage stemmed from weak institutions, which are responsible for implementing the policies.

References

Living people
Eritrean economists
Year of birth missing (living people)
People's Front for Democracy and Justice politicians
Government ministers of Eritrea